Prologue is a 2015 British animated short film directed by Richard Williams and produced by Imogen Sutton.  It was the final film directed by Richard Williams before his death in August 2019.

Summary
It was to be the first part of a planned feature film based on the play Lysistrata by Aristophanes, in which Greek women withhold sexual privilege from their husbands and lovers in order to end a war. The short film depicts the gruesome combat between ancient Greek soldiers, resulting in the death of every combatant and the reveal that the entire skirmish was witnessed by a little girl, who runs off to the comfort of an older woman.

Reception
The film was a critical success and gained many awards and nominations, including an Oscar nomination for Best Animated Short Film.

Awards
 2016: Academy Award for Best Animated Short Film  Nominated (lost to Bear Story)
 2016: BAFTA Award for Best Short Animation  Nominated

References

External links
 
 Trailer

2015 films
2015 animated films
2010s animated short films
British animated short films
Films based on works by Aristophanes
Animated films without speech
Films directed by Richard Williams
Works based on Lysistrata
Films produced by Imogen Sutton
Films set in ancient Greece
2010s English-language films
2010s British films